Michael Kauch (born 4 May 1967, in Dortmund) is a German politician of the Free Democratic Party who served as Member of the Bundestag between 2003 and 2013.

Early life and education
Kauch was born in Dortmund and attended the Helmholtz-Gymnasium. He studied economics at the University of Dortmund from 1986 to 1993.

Political career
Kauch became a member of the Free Democratic Party in Germany in 1989. On 14 June 2003 Kauch became a member of the Bundestag, taking the seat of Jürgen Möllemann who had deceased shortly before. Throughout his time in parliament, he was as a member of the Committee on the Environment, Nature Conservation and Nuclear Safety and of the Parliamentary Advisory Board on Sustainable Development. He also served as his parliamentary group’s rapporteur on LGBT rights, organ transplantation and palliative care (2005-2009).

In the negotiations to form a coalition government of the FDP and the Christian Democrats (CDU together with the Bavarian CSU) following the 2009 federal elections, Kauch led the FDP delegation in the working group on environmental policy, agriculture and consumer protection; his counterpart of the CDU/CSU was Ilse Aigner.

In late 2018, Kauch announced that he would run for a parliamentary seat in the 2019 European elections.

In the negotiations to form a coalition government between the SPD, the Green Party and FDP following the 2021 federal elections, Kauch was part of his party's delegation in the working group on equality, co-chaired by Petra Köpping, Ricarda Lang and Herbert Mertin.

Other activities
 GLOBE Europe, President
 Hirschfeld Eddy Foundation, Member of the Board of Trustees 
 Initiative Queer Nations (IQN), Member
 Magnus Hirschfeld Foundation, Member of the Board of Trustees

Personal life
Kauch is openly gay.

Notes

External links 
 Official Site of Michael Kauch
 Site of the german Bundestag over Michael Kauch

1967 births
Living people
Members of the Bundestag for North Rhine-Westphalia
Gay politicians
LGBT members of the Bundestag
Politicians from Dortmund
Technical University of Dortmund alumni
Members of the Bundestag 2009–2013
Members of the Bundestag 2005–2009
Members of the Bundestag 2002–2005
Members of the Bundestag for the Free Democratic Party (Germany)